Dionysius of Byzantium (Greek ∆ιονύσιος Βυζάντιος, Dionysios Byzantios Latin Dionysius Byzantinus) was a Greek geographer of the 2nd century CE.

He is known for his Ανάπλους Βοσπόρου Anaplous Bosporou Voyage through the Bosporus or De Bospori navigatione, which describes the coastline of the Bosporus and the city of Byzantium (later Constantinople and now İstanbul), described by C. Foss as "one of the most remarkable and detailed of ancient geographic texts". (in Talbert, p. 785)

The work survives with a large lacuna, which is only known from a 16th-century Latin paraphrase by Petrus Gyllius.

Bibliography

 Dionysios of Byzantium, Anaplous of the Bosporos English translation by Brady Kiesling
 Albrecht Dihle, Greek and Latin Literature of the Roman Empire: From Augustus to Justinian, Routledge, 1994, p. 235.  
 Rudolf Güngerich, ed., Anaplus Bospori/De Bospori navigatione. Latin & Greek, Weidmann, 1927 (reprinted 1958).
 Richard J. A. Talbert, Barrington atlas of the Greek and Roman world: Map-by-map Directory, Princeton, 2000. .

Ancient Greek geographers
Geography of Turkey
2nd-century people from Byzantium
2nd-century writers
2nd-century geographers